Roy Hoffman (born June 23, 1953) is an American writer and journalist. He has published several books including his Lillian Smith Book Award-winning novel Almost Family. He has written articles for the New York Times and the Mobile Press-Register. He has also received awards for his literary work.

Personal life

Hoffman was born and raised in a Jewish family in Mobile, Alabama, United States. After receiving his baccalaureate degree in English in 1975, he moved to New York. He has lived Manhattan and Brooklyn for twenty years. He and his family live in Fairhope
.

Career

Hoffman began his writing career from younger age. He contributed to his high school literary magazine. During the study at Tulane University, he also wrote for the college newspaper. He has worked for New York Magazine and WNET-13 public television station. He has also worked for then-Governor Mario M. Cuomo. He has also written articles and book reviews. He has published his first book Almost Family in 1983. His second book was a novel. He has also published a collection of essays.

Awards

 Lillian Smith Book Award, Southern Regional Council, 1983
 Alabama Author Award, Alabama Library Association, 1984

Bibliography

 Almost Family New York: Dial Press, 1983. Rpt. Tuscaloosa: University of Alabama Press, 2000.
 Back Home: Journeys Through Mobile Tuscaloosa: University of Alabama Press, 2001.
 Chicken Dreaming Corn A Novel.Athens: University of Georgia Press, 2004.

References

External links
 Voices rich in Roy Hoffman's 'Alabama Afternoons
 Roy Hoffman
 New York Times

1953 births
Living people
Writers from Mobile, Alabama
Place of birth missing (living people)
21st-century American novelists
American male novelists
American male journalists
Journalists from Alabama
20th-century American novelists
20th-century American male writers
21st-century American male writers
20th-century American non-fiction writers
21st-century American non-fiction writers